I Am Lisa is a 2020 horror revenge film that was directed by Patrick Rea, based on a script written by Eric Winkler.

Synopsis
The film follows Lisa, a young woman who runs a bookstore that was left to her by her deceased grandmother. She is bullied by the local mean girl and drug dealer Jess, who also steals a rare book from the store and later sexually assaults her when the two are alone in the bookstore. Lisa tries to report it to the local police, but is met with dismissal as the sheriff is Jess's mom, Deborah "Deb", and the deputy her brother Nick. In retaliation Deb arranges for Lisa to be viciously assaulted and taken out to the woods. They leave her for dead, expecting that she will be mauled to death by wolves. Lisa manages to survive the encounter but is still bitten by a wolf, turning her into a werewolf. Lisa manages to make it to the home of her friend Sam, who is horrified by what has happened.

Unbeknownst to Lisa, Deb is fully aware that werewolves exist. She had previously beaten and left another girl, Lisa's cousin Gretchen, for the wolves to maul. The girl had survived the attack and become a werewolf, making it necessary for Deb and the others to hunt and kill her. It is also implied that Deb was responsible for the death of the previous sheriff, who had also been mauled to death. As Lisa's transformation continues, Lisa tracks down and kills those who wronged her, beginning with Millie. She also kills Dana after she threatens Sam, as well as Jess and Nick for trashing her bookstore.

In an attempt to stop Lisa, Deb captures Sam and threatens to kill her if Lisa doesn't come to the station. Lisa, aware that the sheriff is untrustworthy, tries to sneak up on her but is unsuccessful. Deb then orders one of her subordinates, Dolphus, to nail Lisa's arms together, after which she reveals that she is going to cut off Lisa's arms and leave her to bleed to death. She also reveals that she was responsible for Gretchen's death, after which she taunts Lisa by cutting off a lock of Sam's hair to test her blade's sharpness. This, along with the rise of the full moon, causes Lisa to fully transform into a werewolf. Lisa slaughters Dolphus and Deb is captured. When Deb awakens she discovers that Lisa plans to leave her to be mauled to death by wolves, the same fate to which she subjected others. The wolves set upon her as Lisa walks calmly away.

Cast
 Kristen Vaganos as Lisa
 Jennifer Seward as Sam
 Manon Halliburton as Sheriff Deborah Huckins
 Carmen Anello as Jessica Huckins
 Chris Bylsma as Deputy Nick Huckins
 Cinnamon Schultz as Mary
 Sarah McGuire as Dana
 Millie Milan as Millie
 Shawn Eric Jones as Dolphus
 Brooklyn Funk as Brooke
 Owen Winkler as Bicycle Boy

Production
Having previously worked for The Kansas City Star, screenwriter Eric Winkler began writing the first draft of the film's script in 2016, and continued working on it through 2019. At the time he began on the draft, Winkler "just wanted to do something creative." He chose to further pursue screenwriting and the script after the death of his father in 2018. Winkler has stated that I Am Lisa is "an homage to every revenge movie I’ve ever seen" and that “It was also heavily influenced by any movie that features a strong female protagonist, like Aliens, Kill Bill, and Day of the Dead.”

Winkler approached Rea during some of his film screenings, both early in the script's development process and later, when the idea was more fully formed. Rea enjoyed the idea of a revenge film, as well as that it was female-driven and in the werewolf genre, and agreed to direct. He suggested that Winkler change more of the characters to women, as the majority were male and he felt that this would make the movie "a lot more interesting" and "play better today". Kristen Vaganos was brought on to play the titular role of Lisa before the script was finalized.

Principal photography for I Am Lisa began in July 2019 and the majority of the footage was shot over a period of 14 days, with the exception of some pick-up shots taken in the following months. Some of the filming locations included an abandoned police station and a bookstore inside Kansas City.

Release
I Am Lisa premiered at the Boulevard Drive-In in Kansas City, Kansas on July 2, 2020, after which it screened at the August digital edition of FrightFest, on August 28.

Reception
Critical reception has been positive. Common praise centered on Rea's direction of the film and the character of Lisa, which Starburst called likeable. Elements of criticism included the lycanthropic makeup and some of the film's lines. The site's critical consensus reads, "A werewolf revenge flick with bite, I Am Lisa is a vibrant and intellectually nimble journey into female empowerment."

References

External links
 

2020 horror films
American werewolf films
Films shot in Kansas
2020s English-language films
2020s American films